Giannis Koromilas (born 20 June 2002) is a Greek professional footballer who plays as a midfielder for Super League 2 club AEK Athens B.

References

2002 births
Living people
Greek footballers
Super League Greece 2 players
AEK Athens F.C. players
Association football midfielders
AEK Athens F.C. B players